Madam Yankelova's Fine Literature Club (Hebrew: המועדון לספרות יפה של הגברת ינקלובה, tr. HaMo'adon LeSifrut Yaffa Shel HaGveret Yankelova) is a 90-minute 2017 Israeli Hebrew-language independent dramatic art film directed by Guilhad Emilio Schenker, at his directorial debut.

Synopsis
It follows Sophie Kafry (Keren Mor), a librarian and member of a women-only bookclub founded by Madam Yankelova (Lea Koenig) and managed by Razia Harari, which meets once a week inside a Gothic castle to discuss works such as Shmuel Yosef Agnon's 1943 short story  and Elfriede Jelinek's 1983 novel The Piano Teacher. All members are required to attend in the company of a man, whereupon said men are judged according to their attractiveness, and the member whose man has received the highest marks wins a trophy. The men, at the end of each meeting, are murdered and turned into hotdogs. Having already won ninety-nine such trophies, Sophie finds it difficult to win the one-hundredth trophy, which shall promise her a seat at the Lordesses's House, the highest status in the club's stratification system. Should she fail to do so, she might find herself demoted into a cleaning lady, together with her friend, Hana (Hana Laszlo), who tells Sophie she plans on escaping to Paris and who invites her to join. One day, Joseph (Yiftach Klein) arrives at the library in which Sophie works, in order to inquire about Agnon's works (Sophie's field of expertise) for research purposes, and she invites him to join her at the club. She falls in love with him during the next couple of days, while her neighbor, Lola (Ania Bukstein), spies on them. Sophie turns to a pawnbroker (Tuvia Tzafir) in order to mobilize funds so as to finance her escaping abroad plans, while Joseph, who by then is revealed to be an undercover policeman, finds suspicious photographs in Sophie's apartment and asks the police archivist for information. The archivist discovers a connection between the club and Joseph's father, who has been missing ever since he was a child. Nevertheless, when Sohpie asks Joseph not to attend the weekly club meeting, he insists on coming there nonetheless. During that meeting, Sophie is declared as the winner, however, in order to win the trophy, she must murder Joseph. Instead, she decides to murder Razia and to take Lola as a hostage, in order to free Joseph. Sophie and Joseph run away, while Lola chases them, and during that chase, Lola shoots them, yet the bullet hits a flammable barrel, an action that causes the castle to go on fire. Sophie and Joseph survive this blast and run away on Joseph's motorcycle. The  has rated this film as being appropriate for viewers aged fourteen and above. It is estimated that only around 10,300 tickets for this film have been sold domestically.

References

External links

 (NMC Music's Globus United King Films Channel) 
 

2017 independent films
2010s serial killer films
2017 films
Films about cannibalism
2010s Hebrew-language films
Films set in castles
Films set in Israel
Films set in libraries
Films shot in Israel
Israeli drama films
Israeli independent films
Women and death
2017 directorial debut films
2017 drama films